Čedomir "Čede" Janevski (born 3 July 1961) is a Macedonian professional football manager and former player who is the manager of the Cypriot club AEL Limassol. He played internationally for both Yugoslavia and Macedonia.

Playing career

Club
During his two-year stint at Club Brugge, the team where he would later become youth trainer, assistant manager and eventually manager, he won both the League in 1990 and the Belgian Cup in 1991.
Despite that he never managed a secure place in the starting line-up. Having only played 35 matches and scoring once over the course of two years.

International
He made his senior debut for Yugoslavia in an August 1987 friendly match against the Soviet Union and has earned a total of 2 caps, scoring no goals for that team. He then made another debut for Macedonia in an October 1993 friendly against Slovenia and has earned a further 5 caps more, scoring no goals. His final international was a June 1995 European Championship qualification match against Belgium in Skopje.

Honours

Player
Club Brugge
Belgian First Division: 1989–90
Belgian Cup: 1990–91

Manager
Olympiacos (as assistant manager)
Super League Greece: 2005–06 (as assistant manager)
Greek Cup: 2005–06(as assistant manager)

Club Brugge
Belgian Cup: Winner 2006–07

References

External links 
Profile at MacedonianFootball 

Cedomir Janevski at Footballdatabase

1961 births
Living people
Footballers from Skopje
Association football defenders
Yugoslav footballers
Yugoslavia international footballers
Macedonian footballers
North Macedonia international footballers
Dual internationalists (football)
FK Skopje players
FK Vardar players
Club Brugge KV players
R. Charleroi S.C. players
İstanbulspor footballers
K.S.C. Lokeren Oost-Vlaanderen players
Yugoslav First League players
Belgian Pro League players
Süper Lig players
Yugoslav expatriate footballers
Macedonian expatriate footballers
Expatriate footballers in Belgium
Macedonian expatriate sportspeople in Belgium
Expatriate footballers in Turkey
Macedonian expatriate sportspeople in Turkey
Macedonian football managers
Club Brugge KV head coaches
Al-Shaab CSC managers
Red Star Belgrade managers
Enosis Neon Paralimni FC managers
Ethnikos Achna FC managers
North Macedonia national football team managers
R.A.E.C. Mons managers
Royal Excel Mouscron managers
S.K. Beveren managers
FK Vardar managers
Ismaily SC managers
AEL Limassol managers
Macedonian expatriate football managers
Expatriate football managers in Belgium
Expatriate football managers in the United Arab Emirates
Macedonian expatriate sportspeople in the United Arab Emirates
Expatriate football managers in Serbia
Macedonian expatriate sportspeople in Serbia
Expatriate football managers in Cyprus
Macedonian expatriate sportspeople in Cyprus
Expatriate football managers in Egypt